Daniel Manohar (born 13 March 1974) is an Indian former cricketer. He played 73 first-class matches for Hyderabad between 1997 and 2007.

See also
 List of Hyderabad cricketers

References

External links
 

1974 births
Living people
Indian cricketers
Hyderabad cricketers
Cricketers from Hyderabad, India